The following is a list of events affecting Canadian television in 2021. Events listed include television show debuts, finales, cancellations, and channel launches, closures and rebrandings.

Events

March

June

July

August

Programs

Programs debuting in 2021

Programs ending in 2021

Television films and specials

Networks and services

Network launches

Network conversions and rebrandings

Network closures

Station closures

Deaths
May 26 – Paul Soles, actor and television personality (The Marvel Super Heroes, Spider-Man) (born 1930)
July 24 – Alfie Scopp, English-born actor (Tales of the Wizard of Oz, Fiddler on the Roof, Rudolph the Red-Nosed Reindeer) (born 1919).
September 14 - Norm Macdonald, comedian and actor better known for his work in American television (born 1959)

References